André Wiwerink (born October 15, 1980) is a German former footballer.

External links

1980 births
Living people
People from Steinfurt (district)
Sportspeople from Münster (region)
German footballers
FC Schalke 04 II players
Wuppertaler SV players
Rot-Weiss Essen players
Bonner SC players
Sportfreunde Lotte players
2. Bundesliga players
Association football defenders
Footballers from North Rhine-Westphalia